Zoe Jones (born 2 September 1992) is an English former professional darts player.

Career
Her first professional tournament victory was when she was sixteen, in the 2009 Girls WDF Europe Youth Cup, when she beat Aliisa Koskivirta of Finland in the final. She has also won consecutive Girls World Masters in 2009 and 2010, beating Emily Davidson and Sara Rosen respectively.

In 2011, she competed in three BDO women's events, namely the Scottish, Welsh and English Opens, losing in the last 16 of all three. She is currently sponsored by Red Dragon Darts, who describe her thus: "We have no doubt that in Zoe we have found a rising star and someone with a bright future in the game."

She also competes at county level for Worcestershire.

World Championship results

BDO
 2015: Quarter Final (lost to Anastasia Dobromyslova 0–2)
 2016: Quarter Final (lost to Ann-Louise Peters 1–2)

References

External links
 
 Zoe Jones' official website#
 Red Dragon Darts profile

1992 births
Living people
English darts players
Sportspeople from Redditch
Female darts players
British Darts Organisation players